Pierre-Charles Roy (1683 — 23 October 1764) was a French poet and man of letters, noted for his collaborations with the composers François Francoeur and André Cardinal Destouches, to produce librettos for several opera-ballets, on classical subjects or pseudo-classical  pastiches, for seven tragedies, and for his rivalry with the young Voltaire, who immortalised Roy with some disdainful public words.

In an early letter of 1719 to Jean-Baptiste Rousseau, Voltaire says, "I have been so unfortunate under the name of Arouet that I have taken another one especially to be confused no more with the poet Roy."

Roy was born and died in Paris.  His first opera libretto, Philomèle, was performed at the Paris Opéra on 20 October 1705. By 1718 he had provided texts for seven tragédies en musique and was being hailed as a successor to Quinault. His involvement with musicians was not always positive: He was involved in a public brawl with composer Rameau after penning a derogatory poem about the latter.

Roy won prizes from the Académie Française and was elected to the Académie des Inscriptions et Belles Lettres, but his attempts to become an immortelle of the Académie Française were repeatedly rejected, occasioning some clandestine satires and epigrams on his part; however, the Duchess of Maine invited him to write for the Grandes Nuits de Sceaux in 1714 and 1715. He was appointed a Chevalier of the Order of St-Michel (1742), the first man of letters to be so honoured; and Mme de Pompadour had his works performed at her Théâtre des Petits Cabinets in the Petite Galerie at Versailles, 1747-51.

Selected works
 Philomèle (1705), his first mounted success
 Bradamante (1707)
 Callirhoé (tragédie en musique, 1712), music by Destouches
 Ariane (1717)  
 Sémiramis (tragédie lyrique, 1718), music by Destouches   
 Les élémens (opéra-ballet, 1721), music by Destouches and Michel Richard Delalande
 Les stratagèmes de l'amour (ballet, 1726), music by Destouches
 Les Augustales (1744)
 La félicité (1745)
 Hippodamie
 Creüse

References 
Polinger, Elliot H: Pierre Charles Roy. Playwright and Satirist (1683-1764), (New York: Institute of French Studies), 1930.

Notes

External links 
 His plays and their presentations on CÉSAR

Writers from Paris
1683 births
1764 deaths
18th-century French poets
18th-century French male writers
French opera librettists